Francisco Bao Rodríguez (20 April 1924 – 13 February 2012), known as Sansón, was a Spanish footballer who played as a defender.

He was the youngest ever player to appear in a La Liga game, when he played for Celta in 1939.

Club career
Born in Vigo, Province of Pontevedra, Galicia, Sansón joined local RC Celta de Vigo in 1939. On 31 December of that year, at only 15 years and 255 days old, he made his La Liga debut in a 4–1 away win against Sevilla FC, one of just six league appearances he would make for the club over two seasons, after which he was deemed surplus to requirements due to his age.

In 1943, after two years with Cultural y Deportiva Leonesa, Sansón returned to the top division with Sporting de Gijón, although he was again only a reserve at that level. Subsequently, he developed into an important player with Asturias neighbours Real Oviedo – also in the latter tier – playing an average of 23 matches during his stint, which included two top-five finishes.

Sansón returned to Celta for the 1950–51 season, where he was utilised as a defender, midfielder and forward, but he was again almost exclusively a backup (20 games in his third year, a total of only 20 in the other four). After rejecting a new five-year contract for 500.000 pesetas, he retired in 1956 after a spell with Xerez CD, with top-flight totals of 167 matches and one goal.

Sansón's record was broken on 24 June 2020, when RCD Mallorca's Luka Romero took the field against Real Madrid.

References

External links

1924 births
2012 deaths
Spanish footballers
Footballers from Vigo
Association football defenders
La Liga players
Segunda División players
RC Celta de Vigo players
Cultural Leonesa footballers
Sporting de Gijón players
Real Oviedo players
Xerez CD footballers